Duke Cheng of Jin (died 600 BC) was from 606 to 600 BC the ruler of the State of Jin, a major power during the Spring and Autumn period of ancient China. His ancestral name was Ji, given name Heitun, and Duke Cheng was his posthumous title.  He was the youngest son of Duke Wen of Jin, and succeeded his nephew Duke Ling of Jin, when Zhao Dun and Zhao Chuan killed Duke Ling and installed Heitun on the throne.

During the seven years of Duke Cheng's reign Jin attacked the states of Zheng, Chu, Qin, and Chen.  Duke Cheng died in 600 BC and was succeeded by his son Duke Jing of Jin.

References

Year of birth unknown
Monarchs of Jin (Chinese state)
7th-century BC Chinese monarchs
600 BC deaths